Aiguebelette may refer to:

Aiguebelette-le-Lac, commune in France
Lac d'Aiguebelette, lake in France